Actihema hemiacta is a species of moth of the family Tortricidae. It is found in Kenya and Tanzania.

The wingspan is 14–18 mm. The forewings are bicoloured. The basal half is fuscous intermixed with brown scales and with black marks and the distal half is whitish. The hindwings are light fuscous with darker transverse striae.

References

Moths described in 1920
Cochylini
Moths of Africa